Alex Smoke is a Scottish music producer and DJ, from Glasgow but based in London, making techno, electronic and classical music.  He has released three studio albums, Incommunicado (2005) and Paradolia (2006) on Soma Records, and Lux (2010) on his own label Hum+Haw. He contributed a track to Cocoon Recordings' Cocoon Compilation F album.

Discography

Releases
Incommunicado (2005)
Paradolia (2006)
Lux (2010)
Love Over Will (2016)

Singles
"Random As" (2002)
"Chica Wappa" (2004)
"Simple Things EP" (2004)
"Brian's Lung" (2005)
"Don't See The Point" (2005)
"Lost in Sounds" (2005)
"OK" (2005)
"Ring.Click.Tink EP" (2005)
"Shminimal" (2005)
"Meany" (2006)
"Neds" / "Ilsa" (2006)
"Never Want To See You Again" (2006)
"Snider" / "Make My Day" (2006)
"Hanged Man EP" (2006)
"Prima Materia" (2006)

Remixes
"Way Up High" by Funk D'Void (2004)
"Bright Lights Fading" by Slam (2005)
"Close Again" by Sid LeRock (2005)
"Grotbox" by Jeremy P Caulfield (2005)
"Las Bicicletas Son Para El Verano" by Alex Smoke (2005)
"Microtron" by Vector Lovers (2005)
"More Intensity" by Pete Tong & Chris Cox (2005)
"Muscle Car" by Mylo (2005)
"Sex Games" by The Backlash (2005)
"Shift" by Solab (2005)
"Transmission" by Radio 4 (2005)
"Safari" by André Kraml (2006)
"Coufault" by Novox (2006)
"Halbzeit" by Arne Michel (2006)
"In The Morning" by Junior Boys (2006)
"Martyr" by Depeche Mode (2006)
"Proverb" by Steve Reich (2006)
"Body2Beat" by Phresh 'N' Low (2006)
"A Matter of Time" by Osaka Ultras (2007)
"Don't Start Just Finish It" by The Unknown Wanderer (2007)

References

External links
RBMA Radio On Demand – Melbourne Marvels – Alex Smoke (Soma)

Year of birth missing (living people)
Living people
Scottish DJs
Electronic dance music DJs